The Australian Capital Territory Electoral Commission, branded Elections ACT, is the agency of the Government of the Australian Capital Territory with responsibility for the conduct of elections and referendums for the unicameral ACT Legislative Assembly; the determination of electoral boundaries for the ACT; and the provision of electoral advice and services to government and on-government agencies. The responsibilities and roles of the Commission are set out in the 1992 Electoral Act and subsequent amendments.

Structure and Staffing
The ACT Electoral Commission comprises three statutory office holders - a part-time Chairperson (Mr Roger Beale), a full-time Electoral Commissioner (Mr Phillip Green) and another part-time member (Dr Christabel Young). The Commissioner has the powers of a Chief Executive under the Public Sector Management Act. At election times the Commissioner seconds additional staff from the ACT Public Service and from other Australian electoral authorities and employs casual staff under the Electoral Act. For administrative purposes, the ACT Electoral Commission comes under the Justice and Community Safety portfolio, with the ACT Attorney General, as the responsible Minister.

See also

 Australian Capital Territory Legislative Assembly
 Electoral systems of the Australian states and territories
 Parliaments of the Australian states and territories

References

External links
 

Elections in the Australian Capital Territory
Electoral commissions in Australia
Government agencies of the Australian Capital Territory